Li Guangxu (born April 24, 1988) is a Chinese male curler and curling coach.

At the international level, he is a 2009 Pacific junior champion curler.

Teams

Men's

Mixed doubles

Record as a coach of national teams

References

External links

Living people
1988 births
Sportspeople from Harbin
Chinese male curlers
Place of birth missing (living people)
Chinese curling coaches